Larusmiani is an Italian  luxury clothing and high-end textile brand established in 1922.

Background
Larusmiani was founded in 1922 by Guglielmo Miani, a tailor catering to local artists and Italian actors. He opened his first store in 1929. He was the first person to import vicuña wool to Italy.

His son joined the shop at the age of 14, and developed a textile collection which he commercialized to French and Italian tailors.

In 1965, Prince Philip, Duke of Edinburgh visited a Larusmiani store in Milan, the company being the largest importer of British textiles in Italy. In 1970, Guglielmo Miani was entitled Officer of the Most Excellent Order of the British Empire.

The Larusmiani Concept Boutique has been located in Milan on Via Montenapoleone since 1954.

In 2007, Guglielmo Miani, grandson of the founder, was named CEO of Larusmiani. In November 2013, Larusmiani acquired the high-end men's grooming brand G. Lorenzi to give it a second breath within the Via Montenapoleone store.

Description
Larusmiani hires 40 master tailors, and produces and distributes more than 2 million metres of fabric a year, created using cotton, wool, cashmere and linen fibres.

Its logo is the larus, which is Latin for "seagull".

Larusmiani shows its collections at Milan Fashion Week. Some Larusmiani-branded products are distributed by J.Crew.

See also
Brioni
Canali
Loro Piana
Ermenegildo Zegna
Bottega Veneta
Kiton

References

External links
 Official website

Clothing brands of Italy
Luxury brands
High fashion brands
Italian companies established in 1922
Italian suit makers